The 1986 Gent–Wevelgem was the 48th edition of the Gent–Wevelgem cycle race and was held on 19 April 1986. The race started in Ghent and finished in Wevelgem. The race was won by Guido Bontempi of the  team.

General classification

References

Gent–Wevelgem
1986 in road cycling
1986 in Belgian sport
1986 Super Prestige Pernod International